Delaware v. Prouse, 440 U.S. 648 (1979), was a United States Supreme Court case in which the Court held that police may not stop motorists without any reasonable suspicion to suspect crime or illegal activity to check their driver's license and auto registration.

References

External links
 

United States Supreme Court cases
United States Supreme Court cases of the Burger Court
United States Fourth Amendment case law
1979 in United States case law